Avner Sher (born 1951) is an Israeli architect and artist.

Biography
Avner Sher was  born in the Wadi Salib neighborhood of  Haifa, and raised in Kiryat Eliezer and Kiryat Eliyahu.  His parents were Holocaust survivors. Sher was an only child. His mother died of cancer when he was 14 years old.  In elementary school,  he drew cartoons for his school newspaper.
From the age of 6 he studied piano at Beit Hagefen in Haifa. A rock band he organized with friends performed the opening act for established musicians,  among them Zvika Pik.  He began composing at 17, but abandoned music at 22 and decided to become a painter.

He enrolled at  Bezalel Academy of Art and Design but his father insisted that he learn a profession. 
He completed his studies in architecture at the Technion in Haifa in  1979, graduating with honors. While working as an architect, Sher also learn    arts from the University of Haifa.

Architecture career
Sher opened his architecture firm in 1992. He has designed many shopping centers and malls  in Israel, including the malls in Mevasseret Zion,  Ramle, Zichron Yaakov, Raanana, Nahariya, Beersheba, Carmiel, Kiryat Bialik, Kiryat Ata, Kfar Saba, Netanya, Yokne’am and Eilat.
Other public buildings designed by Sher are the Kiryat Motzkin municipality and the courthouse in the Krayot.

Art career

In 1999, Sher moved to Tel Aviv and had an experience that changed his life: He stopped at a gas station near Beit Yanai and saw that the restroom walls were covered with graffiti.  Captivated by the wildness and artistic freedom they conveyed,  he felt the urge to tear down barriers in his own work. He began to paint and draw on cork panels mounted on wood, lacerating the surface with knives, screwdrivers and electric saws, burning it with a wood-burning etching pencil and splattering it with substances like coffee, mud, ketchup and red wine.
His work is also rooted in the iconography of the Levant. He references ancient visual languages and hieroglyphics while maintaining a universal theme combining prehistoric elements and childlike symbolism.  Common motifs in his work are fish, faces, spirals and images of flora and fauna.  Sometimes he incorporates Biblical verses, especially  from the Book of Genesis and Psalms. As the son of parents who survived Dachau, Sher grew up in the shadow of the Holocaust and the numbers tattooed on their arms. The tattoo thus became a visual code in his work.

His first important show was in 2002 at Mabat Gallery in Tel Aviv in 2002.
Since then, he has had over 20 solo exhibits and has taken part in over 30 group exhibits in Israel and around the world. 
At the Jerusalem Biennale in 2017, Sher presented his installation “950m2 – Alternative Topographies,” which was displayed at the Tower of David Museum overlooking the walls of Jerusalem’s Old City. Composed of two series, “Maps of Jerusalem” and “Spoila,” the installation explores the idea of “perpetually devolving city space.” 
At the pan-European art biennale Manifesta 12 in Palermo, Italy, Sher’s installation addresses the issue of migration and refugees making “bold, sometimes ironic use of symbols.”

Selected solo exhibitions
2018 – Bridge Palermo Jerusalem,  Palermo, Italy
2017 -  950m2 Alternative Topographies, Tower of David museum, Jerusalem Biennale, Jerusalem
	2015 – Landmarks, Artists House, Tel Aviv
	2014 – A Bird on a Wire, Bar David Museum, Kibbutz Bar'am
	2014 – Jacob’s Dream, New York
	2014 – The Secret, Jaffa Port
	2002 – This is His Tattoo, Mabat Gallery, Tel Aviv

See also
Visual arts in Israel
List of Israeli visual artists
Architecture of Israel

References

External  links
 Scratching Images
 Interview at Scope Miami 2017

1951 births
Living people
Israeli artists
Israeli architects